Route 376 is a collector road in the Canadian province of Nova Scotia.

It is located in Pictou County and connects West River at Trunk 4 with Pictou at Highway 106. It was originally part of Trunk 6 until 1970

Blue Route
Traffic volumes are comparatively light on this highway. As a result, in 2017, portions of Route 376 and Trunk 4, and Pictou's Jitney Trail became the first segment of Nova Scotia's Blue Route, a designated cycling corridor.

Communities

West River
Durham
Lyons Brook
Haliburton

See also
List of Nova Scotia provincial highways

References

Nova Scotia provincial highways
Roads in Pictou County